Bhadarsa is a town and nagar panchayat in Faizabad district (now Ayodhya district) in state of  Uttar Pradesh, India. Bhadarsa is 22 km south of district headquarters Ayodhya city.

Transport

Road 
Due to very close to Faizabad - Sultanpur NH 330, Bhadarsa is very well connectivity with nearby cities and towns in Uttar Pradesh. Faizabad, Ayodhya, Sultanpur, Pratapgarh, Allahabad are the nearby cities connected well with Bhadarsa, Ayodhya. Bikapur, Masodha, Tarun, Haiderganj, Chaure Bazar, Sohawal, Maya Bazar, Kurebhar, Bhiti, Goshainganj,  Milkipur, Kumarganj are the nearby towns well connected with Bhadarsa.

Railway 
Bharatkund Railway Station is the nearest railway station to reach Bhadarsa, Ayodhya. Masodha, Faizabad Junction (Ayodhya Cantt Junction), Ayodhya Junction, Chaure Bazar, Goshainganj, Kurebhar, Sultanpur Junction are the nearby railway stations from Bhadarsa.

Air 
Ayodhya Airport in Ayodhya and Chaudhary Charan Singh Airport (Lucknow ) are the nearby airports from Bhadarsa, Ayodhya.

Demographics
As of the 2011 Census of India, Bhadarsa had a population of 13154. Males constitute 51% of the population and females 49%. Bhadarsa has an average literacy rate of 55%, lower than the national average of 59.5%; with 58% of the males and 42% of females literate. 12% of the population is under 6 years of age.

References

Cities and towns in Faizabad district